Hans Gustafsson (21 December 1923 – 25 August 1998) was a Swedish social democratic politician who held several government posts and was a member of the Swedish Parliament.

Biography
Gustafsson was born on 21 December 1923. He was appointed minister for civil service in 1973, and then he served as minister for physical planning and local government for two years between 1974 and 1976. His last ministerial post was the minister of housing which he held from 1982 to 1988 in the second cabinet of Olof Palme and in the first cabinet of Ingvar Carlsson.

Gustafsson was also a member of the Social Democratic Party and served in the parliament for eighteen years in the period of 1976-1994 representing Blekinge County constituency. He died on 25 August 1998.

References

1923 births
1998 deaths
Government ministers of Sweden
Members of the Riksdag 1976–1979
Members of the Riksdag 1979–1982
Members of the Riksdag 1982–1985
Members of the Riksdag 1985–1988
Members of the Riksdag 1988–1991
Members of the Riksdag 1991–1994
Members of the Riksdag from the Social Democrats
People from Blekinge
Swedish Ministers for Housing